Rivière-Salée (Martinican Creole: ,  or ) is a town and commune in the French overseas department and region of Martinique.

Population

Notable people
André Lesueur (born 1947), mayor of Rivière-Salée and former member of the French National Assembly

See also
Communes of the Martinique department

References

Communes of Martinique
Populated places in Martinique